Turatia scioneura is a moth in the family Autostichidae. It was described by Edward Meyrick in 1929. It is found in Sudan.

The wingspan is about 19 mm. The forewings are whitish sprinkled with light grey, appearing grey whitish. There is an undefined median streak of grey suffusion from near the base to one-fourth and some fuscous sprinkling from this along the fold. The discal stigmata form small elongate spots of blackish sprinkles, with slight streaks of fuscous sprinkles along the upper edge of the cell between these, and along the veins between this and the costa. The hindwings are whitish grey.

References

Endemic fauna of Sudan
Moths described in 1929
Turatia